Roberto Trashorras Gayoso (born 28 February 1981) is a Spanish retired footballer who played as a central midfielder, currently manager of Polvorín FC.

Having come through Barcelona's academy, he spent most of his professional career with Rayo Vallecano, appearing in 219 competitive matches. Totalling both clubs, he amassed La Liga totals of 171 games and seven goals.

Club career

Born in Rábade, Province of Lugo, Galicia, Trashorras finished his youth career with FC Barcelona, playing one game with the first team on 6 October 2001, a 2–1 La Liga away loss against Deportivo de La Coruña where he came on as a second-half substitute for Alfonso Pérez. In the summer of 2003 he moved to Real Madrid, only managing to appear for their reserves.

Trashorras joined Segunda División side CD Numancia for 2005–06. He featured very little during his tenure – less than one third of the games– and switched to UD Las Palmas also in that league the following season, finally establishing himself in professional football.

In July 2008, Trashorras signed a five-year contract with RC Celta de Vigo of division two. An undisputed starter from the beginning, he had his best season in 2009–10, scoring nine goals in 38 matches and helping the Galicians to the quarter-finals of the Copa del Rey, where they were ousted by eventual finalists Atlético Madrid (2–1 on aggregate, with the player netting in the first leg in Madrid in a 1–1 draw).

On 11 August 2011, after reaching an agreement to terminate his contract with Celta, Trashorras moved to Rayo Vallecano, recently promoted to the top tier. On 31 January 2018, after seven seasons as first choice and captain, the 37-year-old left the club.

On 29 August 2018, after several months of inactivity, Trashorras announced his retirement. Three years later, he was appointed youth coach of CD Lugo, and in June 2022 upgraded to their reserve team.

References

External links

Celta de Vigo biography 

1981 births
Living people
People from Lugo (comarca)
Sportspeople from the Province of Lugo
Spanish footballers
Footballers from Galicia (Spain)
Association football midfielders
La Liga players
Segunda División players
Segunda División B players
Tercera División players
FC Barcelona C players
FC Barcelona Atlètic players
FC Barcelona players
Real Madrid Castilla footballers
CD Numancia players
UD Las Palmas players
RC Celta de Vigo players
Rayo Vallecano players
Spain youth international footballers
Spanish football managers
Segunda Federación managers